"Listen to the Radio" is a song written by Fred Knipe, and recorded by American country music artist Don Williams.  It was released in April 1982 as the first single and title track from his album Listen to the Radio.  The song reached number 3 on the Billboard Hot Country Singles chart and number 1 on the RPM Country Tracks chart in Canada.

Charts

References

1982 singles
1982 songs
Don Williams songs
Song recordings produced by Garth Fundis
MCA Records singles
Songs about radio